The Kurdish state was an autonomous government in Southern Kurdistan that existed from October 1918 to June 1919.  

Though it was initially subordinate to Britain, it was eventually dissolved following an anti-British rebellion.

Name 
"Kurdish state" is an exonym that was used by British officials in London and the Middle East to describe this polity during its existence. Saad Eskander argues that this term is incorrect, as it was not fully independent.

History

Establishment 
With the collapse of the Ottoman Empire in October 1918, Mahmud Barzanji sought to break away from the Ottomans and create an autonomous southern Kurdistan under British supervision. He was elected as the head of government by a council of Kurdish notables in the Sulaimaniya region, and as soon as the British captured Kirkuk (25 October 1918) he captured Ottoman troops present in his district and declared the end of Ottoman rule, pledging allegiance to Britain. Other Kurdish regions followed suit, such as Rania and Keuisenjaq.

The Ottoman position was that the region was still legally under their rule, despite the armistice. (Further information: Mosul Question) They did not recognize the Kurdish state. In contrast, British officials on the ground chose to accept Kurdish cooperation, despite officially lacking a well-defined policy on southern Kurdistan.

Mahmud Barzanji was designated by the British as governor of Kurdish area B, which extended from south of the Lesser Zab River to the old Ottoman-Persian frontier. Barzanji attempted to expand his influence outside his designated region, and used British subsidies, provided for salaries and to assist recovery from the ravages of war, in order to consolidate his power base, buying the loyalty of chieftains. This led to deteriorating relations with the British, setting the stage for an eventual revolt.

Rebellion and defeat 
On 23 May 1919, a few months after being appointed governor of Sulaymaniyah, Barzanji raised 300 tribal fighters, expelled British supervisors and proclaimed himself "Ruler of all Kurdistan", initiating the first of the Mahmud Barzanji revolts. Early in the rebellion, the Kurds saw some success with the successful ambush of a light British column that strayed beyond Chamchamal. On both sides of the border, tribes proclaimed themselves for Shaykh Mahmud.

Using his authority as a religious leader, Sheykh Mahmud called for a jihad against the British in 1919 and thus acquired the support of many Kurds indifferent to the nationalist struggle. Although the intensity of their struggle was motivated by religion, Kurdish peasantry seized the idea of "national and political liberty for all" and strove for "an improvement in their social standing".

Tribal fighters from both Iran and Iraq quickly allied themselves with Sheykh Mahmud as he became more successful in opposing British rule. According to McDowall, the Sheykh's forces "were largely Barzinja tenantry and tribesmen, the Hamavand under Karim Fattah Beg, and disaffected sections of the Jaf, Jabbari, Sheykh Bizayni and Shuan tribes". The popularity and numbers of Sheykh Mahmud's troops only increased after their ambush of a British military column.

Among the supporters of Sheykh Mahmud was also the 16-year-old Mustafa Barzani, who was to become the future leader of the Kurdish nationalist cause and a commander of the Peshmerga forces. Barzani and his men, following the orders of Barzani tribal Shekyh Ahmed Barzani, crossed the Piyaw Valley to join Sheykh Mahmud Barzanji. Even though being ambushed several times, Barzani and his men reached Sheykh Mahmud's location, but arrived too late to aid in the revolt. The Barzani fighters were only a part of the Sheykh's 500-person force.

As the British became aware of the sheykh's growing political and military power, they were forced to respond militarily, and two brigades defeated the 500-strong Kurdish force in the Bazyan Pass on 18 June, and occupied Halabja on the 28th, ending the Kurdish state and defeating the rebellion.

Government 

Mahmud Barzanji was the head of government when the Kurdish state was established. On 1 December 1918, British authorities recognized him as hukumdar (governor) of Sulaymaniya division.

British involvement was restricted to a role of supervision, and the local government retained autonomy in regards to matters relating to judiciary and revenue. Edward Noel was appointed by Arnold Wilson as political officer responsible for supervision.

Language 
The government gave Kurdish the status of being an official language.

Flag 
This government used the flag of the United Kingdom until May 1919.

Ilhan Kilic states that the government "raised the Kurdish flag" upon rebellion on 23 May 1919, though he does not provide any details about its design. However, the authors of From Enemies to Allies: Turkey and Britain, 1918–1960 go in more detail about its design, stating "The flag designed in 1919 was green with a red circle and white crescent inside the circle." flaglog.com, an online index of flags, likewise corroborates that "Mahmud Barzanji revolted against the British under a green Kurdish flag. The revolt was supressed in June but Barzanji would return in 1922 to declare an unrecognized Kingdom of Kurdistan under the same flag."

See also 

 Kingdom of Kurdistan - new attempt at a Kurdish state a few years later.
 Mahmud Barzanji revolts

References 

Former Kurdish states in Iraq
States and territories established in 1918
States and territories disestablished in 1919